Giorgio Pasetto (4 July 1941 – 12 May 2022) was an Italian politician. He was member of Christian Democracy, the Italian People's Party, and Democracy is Freedom – The Daisy. He served as President of Lazio from 1992 to 1994, was a member of the Chamber of Deputies from 1996 to 2006, and a Senator from 2006 to 2008. He died in Rome on 12 May 2022 at the age of 80.

References

1941 births
2022 deaths
People from Nettuno
20th-century Italian politicians
21st-century Italian politicians
Presidents of Lazio
Deputies of Legislature XIII of Italy
Deputies of Legislature XIV of Italy
Senators of Legislature XV of Italy
Democracy is Freedom – The Daisy politicians
Christian Democracy (Italy) politicians
Democratic Party (Italy) politicians